Gardening Australia is an Australian lifestyle television program which suggests and promotes organic and environmentally friendly ways of gardening. It is created by the Australian Broadcasting Corporation and airs on ABC TV,  in an hour-long weekly show each Friday evening.

A monthly magazine, Gardening Australia, was spawned by the show.

History
The series has its origins in 1969 as It's Growing, with five minute segments broadcast ahead of the Sunday night news on ABT2 in Hobart. It was hosted by Peter Cundall, an experienced gardener with a passion for growing plants using organic methods. He had hosted a gardening talkback segment on ABC radio in Hobart since 1967. It was renamed Landscape in 1972 and extended to 15 minutes per episode.

The format was adapted into Gardening Australia in 1990, broadcast nationally with the format expanded to 30 minutes per episode. It was still hosted by Cundall with other gardening experts from around Australia. Stephen Ryan succeeded Cundall in 2009. After three years as host, Ryan's contract was not renewed by ABC. Costa Georgiadis was announced as the new host in December 2011 for the 2012 series.

Presenters
In addition to the host, each episode contains segments which are recorded across Australia with local presenters.

Current presenters 
 the presenters are:
Josh Byrne (WA)
Jerry Coleby-Williams (QLD)
Jane Edmanson (VIC)
Millie Ross (VIC)
Sophie Thomson (SA)
Clarence Slockee (NSW)
Tammy Huynh (NSW)
Hannah Moloney (TAS)

Past presenters

Guest presenters

Segments

Cundall had a segment called Pete's Mailbag where viewers could ask questions or send in photographs or letters about their own gardens.

The show has several segments, which include all forms of gardening, from sculptural and artistic gardens to vegetable growing and xeriscaping. Most segments are filmed on location.

The program has an Ask It/Solve It section where people can submit their garden questions/problems to be answered by the presenters.

The 6 Bed Rotation Vegetable Crop (formally Pete's Patch) at the Royal Tasmanian Botanical Gardens is still in the show, now called 'The Vegie Patch' with Tino Carnevale presenting.

The Vegie Guide is a new feature which suggests a range of vegetables that can be planted each month, in the broad climate zones around Australia.

Magazine
Gardening Australia is a monthly magazine published by the ABC and marketed by ABC Commercial, featuring articles by presenters on the show.

See also

 List of longest-running Australian television series
 List of programs broadcast by ABC Television
 List of Australian television series

References

External links
 Official website
 

Australian non-fiction television series
Australian Broadcasting Corporation original programming
1990 Australian television series debuts
Gardening television
Television shows set in Melbourne